Wash Water is a hamlet on the border of Berkshire, and Hampshire. It is divided between the civil parishes of Enborne (where according to Grid Refs the majority of the population at the 2011 Census was included), Newbury, Highclere and East Woodhay.

Some locals claim it is named after the spot on the River Enborne where women washed the troops' clothes during or after the First Battle of Newbury of the English Civil War, others say it is because wool was washed in the local rivers before fulling in the two nearby mills.

Village facilities include a public house called the Woodpecker Inn, formerly the Derby Arms.

References

Hamlets in Berkshire
West Berkshire District